Sergio Bareiro (born 4 November 1998) is a Paraguayan footballer who plays for Asociación Deportiva Guanacasteca Costa Rica.

References

1998 births
Living people
Paraguayan footballers
Chilean Primera División players
C.D. Huachipato footballers
Association football defenders
Cerro Porteño players
Paraguayan Primera División players